Tular is a village in the Sendurai taluk of Ariyalur district, Tamil Nadu, India.

Demographics 

 census, Tular had a total population of 2,456 with 1,223 males and 1,233 females.

References 

Villages in Ariyalur district